Lawrence Delano De Varney (August 9, 1880 – April 23, 1950) was a Major League Baseball pitcher. He played professionally for the Cleveland Bronchos during part of the  season.

Early life and career
Varney, was born in Dover, New Hampshire and played college baseball at Dartmouth College. He started three games for the Cleveland Bronchos, all in July 1902. He gave up 31 baserunners, (14 hits, 12 walks, and 5 hit batsmen) and 10 earned runs in 14.2 total innings. His lone win came against the Detroit Tigers, and his only loss was to the Baltimore Orioles.

In Varney's short Major League career, he won one game, lost one game with seven strikeouts and an ERA of 6.14.

He died at the age of 69 in Long Island City, New York.

References

External links
 

Retrosheet

1880 births
1950 deaths
Major League Baseball pitchers
Cleveland Bronchos players
Haverhill Hustlers players
New Bedford Whalers (baseball) players
Baseball players from New Hampshire
People from Dover, New Hampshire
Sportspeople from Strafford County, New Hampshire
Burials at Green-Wood Cemetery